= Thar Gyi =

Burmese painter (born 1966)

- သားကြီး
- Born: Min Han Pyone; 1966 (age 59–60); Rangoon, Burma.
- Education: Art Influence by his Uncle (Modern Sculptor); Artist U Win Myint and Maung Maung Ba’s (Painter).
- Known for: Painter

Thar Gyi (Burmese: သားကြီး; born 1966) is a Burmese painter. He is one of Myanmar's most creative and successful abstract artists and created impressionist work from 1998 until 2002.

== Early life and career ==
Thar Gyi was born in 1966 in Rangoon, Burma. He was descendant from family of artists, his uncles being modernist sculptor Win Myint, one of the founders of Lokanat Art Galleries. He started his painter career before the 1988 pro-democracy uprising. “Foreigners from embassies came and bought dozens of paintings from us before the government of the Burma Socialist Program Party demonetized the 75 kyat banknote. The government demonetized the banknotes after they bought the paintings. But, later they came back and paid with other banknotes. We were so happy,” he recalled.

While working at the art gallery of his uncle in Yangon’s Bogyoke Market, he got acquainted with the works of well-known artists. His early creations focused on realism, impressionism, and expressionism. In the 2000s, his works have been collected by collectors and art museums in Thailand, Vietnam, Singapore, Indonesia, India, China, Korea, the US and Canada.
